Nikolayevsk-on-Amur is a town in Khabarovsk Krai, Russia located on the Amur River close to its liman in the Pacific Ocean. Population:

Geography
It is the closest significant settlement to the Strait of Tartary separating the mainland from Sakhalin.

History

Medieval and early-modern history
In the late Middle Ages, the people living along the lower course of the Amur (Nivkh, Oroch, Evenki) were collectively known in China as the "wild Jurchen". The Yuan Dynasty Mongols sent expeditions to this area with an eye toward using the region as a base for attack on Japan, or for defending against the Sakhalin Ainus. According to the History of Yuan, in 1264 the Nivkhs recognized the Mongol sovereignty. At roughly the same time, a shrine was built on the Tyr Rock.

From 1411 to 1433, the Ming eunuch Yishiha, a man of Haixi Jurchen origin, led four large missions to win over the allegiance of the "Jurchen" tribes along the Sunggari and Amur Rivers. During this time, the Yongning Temple was constructed at Tyr, and stelae with inscriptions erected.

Russian period

The Russian settlement, likely preceded by the Manchu village of Fuyori, was founded as Nikolayevsky Post by Gennady Nevelskoy on 13 August 1850 and named for Tsar Nicholas I.

The settlement quickly became one of the main economic centres on the Pacific coast of the Russian Empire. It became Russia's main Pacific harbour (replacing Petropavlovsk) in 1855 after the Siege of Petropavlovsk of 1854. It was granted town status and renamed Nikolayevsk-on-Amur in 1856, when Primorskaya Oblast was established. Admiral Vasily Zavoyko supervised the construction of a naval base in Nikolayevsk-on-Amur.

The town emerged as an important commercial harbour; however, due to navigational difficulties caused by the sandbanks in the Amur estuary and because sea ice made the harbour unusable for five months each year, the main Russian shipping activities in the Pacific transferred to the better situated Vladivostok in the early 1870s. The town remained the administrative centre of this region until 1880, when the governor relocated to Khabarovsk. Anton Chekhov, visiting the town on his journey to Sakhalin in 1890, noted its rapid depopulation, although this trend slowed somewhat in the late 1890s with the discovery of gold and the establishment of salmon fisheries.

During the Russian Civil War of 1917-1922 the town's population plummeted from 15,000 to 2,000, as a local Soviet partisan leader, Yakov Tryapitsyn, later executed by the same Bolsheviks he was supposed to be aligned with, razed the entire town to the ground and massacred the minority Japanese population along with most of the Russian population. In response to this event, Northern Sakhalin was briefly occupied by Japan between 1920-1925. During this time, the town was called .

Around 1940 a prison camp of the gulag system was located in the town.

Like many other places in the Russian Far East, the town has seen a drop in population since the dissolution of the Soviet Union, dropping from 36,296 inhabitants recorded in the (1989 Census), to 22,772 in 2010.

Administrative and municipal status
Within the framework of administrative divisions, Nikolayevsk-on-Amur serves as the administrative center of Nikolayevsky District, even though it is not a part of it. As an administrative division, it is incorporated separately as the town of krai significance of Nikolayevsk-na-Amure—an administrative unit with the status equal to that of the districts. As a municipal division, the town of krai significance of Nikolayevsk-na-Amure is incorporated within Nikolayevsky Municipal District as Nikolayevsk-na-Amure Urban Settlement.

Economy
Fishing and fish processing are the main industries of the town, along with ship maintenance and some agricultural production in the surrounding area.

Transportation
Nikolayevsk-on-Amur has no land transport connections. Traffic to and from the town enters via the port on the Amur, or the small airport, namely Nikolayevsk-on-Amur Airport , which is home to Nikolaevsk-Na-Amure Air Enterprise.

Climate
Nikolayevsk-on-Amur has a borderline humid continental climate (Köppen Dfb), almost cold enough to be a subarctic climate (Dfc). Precipitation is not as low in the winter as over most of Siberia since the coast in on the fringe of influence from the Aleutian Low. The near-maritime location only marginally—by —moderates the winters compared to interior Siberia, but makes the summers noticeably cool (especially in May and June) though the Oyashio fogs are less prevalent than on Sakhalin itself and sunshine hours therefore rather longer.

Gallery

References

Notes

Sources

Cities and towns in Khabarovsk Krai
Amur River
Ports and harbours of the Russian Pacific Coast
Port cities and towns in Russia
Populated places established in 1850
1850 establishments in the Russian Empire
Road-inaccessible communities of Russia